Jodie Hicks (born 19 January 1997) is an Australian rules footballer who plays for the Greater Western Sydney Giants in the AFL Women's (AFLW) competition, and a cricketer playing for the Sydney Sixers in the Women's Big Bash League
.

Early life
Hicks was born and raised in Hay, in the western Riverina region of New South Wales.
She was a passionate Australian rules footballer until the age of 14, when the combination of a lack of female-dedicated teams and rules forbidding her continuing to play with boys forced her to give up the sport. From there she took up cricket, becoming accomplished as a junior.

Australian rules football
Since giving up competitive football at age 14 Hicks played only at select representative carnivals.

AFL Women's
Hicks was drafted by Greater Western Sydney with their first pick and the fifth selection overall in the 2017 AFL Women's draft.

She made her debut in the six-point loss to Melbourne at Casey Fields in the opening round of the 2018 season.

In June 2021, Hicks was delisted by the Greater Western Sydney, after playing 20 games over four seasons.

In June 2022, after not playing in the 2022 (A) AFL Women's season when she played and coached with Macquarie University, Hicks was re-drafted by Greater Western Sydney ahead of the 2022 (B) AFL Women's season.

Cricket
Hicks plays club cricket at Sydney Cricket Club in Sydney.
In the 2015 female national championships Hicks represented the NWS/ACT, scoring 151 runs (18.9 ave) and taking seven wickets (19.3 ave). As a result she was later selected in the Australian under 18 squad that same year. She was also invited to the Cricket Australia under 18 talent camp.

She has since played for the ACT Meteors in the Women's National Cricket League and the Sydney Sixers in the Women's Big Bash League.

References

External links 

 Jodie Hicks – Cricket Australia Profile

1997 births
Living people
Greater Western Sydney Giants (AFLW) players
Australian rules footballers from the Australian Capital Territory
Cricketers from the Australian Capital Territory
ACT Meteors cricketers
Sydney Sixers (WBBL) cricketers